Kang Seung-Jo (born January 20, 1986) is a South Korea football player.

Club career
He played for many K League sideds including Busan IPark, Jeonbuk Hyundai Motors, Gyeongnam FC, FC Seoul. He scored 1 goals in 2014 AFC Champions League.

References

External links
 
 Kang Seung-jo – National Team stats at KFA 

1986 births
Living people
South Korean footballers
Busan IPark players
Jeonbuk Hyundai Motors players
Gyeongnam FC players
FC Seoul players
Ansan Mugunghwa FC players
Daejeon Hana Citizen FC players
K League 1 players
K League 2 players
Footballers from Seoul
Dankook University alumni
Association football midfielders